The Draft Communications Data Bill (nicknamed the Snoopers' Charter or Snooper's Charter) was draft legislation proposed by then Home Secretary Theresa May in the United Kingdom which would require Internet service providers and mobile phone companies to maintain records of each user's internet browsing activity (including social media), email correspondence, voice calls, internet gaming, and mobile phone messaging services and store the records for 12 months. Retention of email and telephone contact data for this time is already required by the Data Retention Regulations 2014. The anticipated cost was £1.8 billion.

May originally expected the bill to be introduced in the 2012–13 legislative session, carried over to the following session, and enacted as law in 2014. However, the former Deputy Prime Minister Nick Clegg withdrew his support for this bill in April 2013, saying "a law which means there would be a record kept of every website you visit, who you communicate with on social media sites ... it is certainly not going to happen with Liberal Democrats in government", and his Liberal Democrat party blocked it from being reintroduced during the 2010-2015 Parliament. Shortly after the Conservative victory in May 2015, May vowed to introduce the Communications Data Bill in the next parliament. In November 2015, May announced a new Investigatory Powers Bill similar to the Draft Communications Data Bill, although with more limited powers and additional oversight.

History

Intercept Modernisation

The powers and intent of the Bill were preceded by plans under the last Labour administration to improve access to communications traffic data, under the Interception Modernisation Programme. The plans did not become a firm legislative proposal and were strongly opposed by both Conservative and Liberal Democrat opposition parties.

The new coalition agreement in 2010 committed to ending the storing of email and Internet records "without good reason". The IMP was not entirely abandoned however, and the Home Office under the new coalition committed to examining the problem of access to communications data under the Communications Capabilities Development Programme.

Queen's Speech
The government announced its intention to legislate in order to "maintain capability" of law enforcement access to communications traffic data in 2012.

Joint Committee
As the result of public reaction to the proposed Bill and internal Liberal Democrat opposition to the Bill, Nick Clegg asked for the Bill to be referred to a Joint Committee to scrutinise the proposal. The Committee reported in December 2012.

Counter Terrorism Bill 2015 
In 2015 a cross-party group of lords — Tom King, Baron King of Bridgwater, former Conservative Defence Secretary; Ian Blair, Baron Blair of Boughton, former Commissioner of Police of the Metropolis and crossbench peer; Alex Carlile, Baron Carlile of Berriew, former Independent Reviewer of counter-terrorism legislation and Lib Dem peer; and Alan West, Baron West of Spithead, former Labour Minister for Security and Counter-Terrorism — attempted to add the text of the Communications Data Bill to the Counter-Terrorism and Security Bill, which became the Counter-Terrorism and Security Act 2015. However this was dropped before going to a vote due to opposition.

Powers
The bill would amend the Regulation of Investigatory Powers Act 2000.

Data collection
The bill would create a wide-ranging power to compel any 'communications service provider' to collect and retain additional information about their users. Current data retention obligations require ISPs to retain data collected for business purposes for longer than normal. Under the new bill, any organisation that interacts with users and produces or transmits electronic communications could be compelled to collect and retain information about them, even if it is entirely irrelevant to their business needs.

Deep Packet Inspection
One technique that may be used to collect user data could be Deep Packet Inspection.

According to Office for Security and Counter-Terrorism Charles Farr, formerly of MI6, so-called "black boxes" – DPI – probes are not the "central plank" of the 2012 Communications Data Bill.  The boxes would be used when communications service providers refuse to submit data, but he anticipated that most would maintain data about users in unencrypted form from which contact information could readily be separated from content.  This would circumvent SSL encryption during transmission.  He said that the DPI boxes were already "used as a matter of course" by ISPs.  The Mastering the Internet system was described in 2009 by The Register and The Sunday Times as the replacement for scrapped plans for a single central database, involving thousands of DPI "black boxes" at ISPs in association with the GCHQ base in Cheltenham, funded out of a Single Intelligence Account budget of £1.6 bn, including a £200m contract with Lockheed Martin and a contract with BAE Systems Detica.  In 2008 the black box infrastructure was operated by Detica, which had been expected to win additional contracts for its proposed expansion in the Communications Data Bill 2008.

Filtering arrangements
The bill creates arrangements to interrogate and match data from different data sources. The justification is that only relevant data would be returned, thus improving personal privacy. Additionally, police cite problems matching data from for instance different cell phone masts.

However, the bill has been said to provide the legislative basis for a "giant database" that would allow "quite complicated questions" about "communications behaviors and patterns" which could become a "honeypot for casual hackers, blackmailers, criminals large and small from around the world, and foreign states", as Lord Strasburger described it, as the bill was scrutinised by the Joint Committee of MPs and peers.

The BBC reported that the Home Office stressed that the bill was intended for targeted surveillance rather than "fishing expeditions", but quoted opponent Nick Pickles, director of Big Brother Watch: "The filtering provisions are so broadly worded and so poorly drafted that it could allow mining of all the data collected, without any requirement for personal information, which is the very definition of a fishing trip."

Open Rights Group campaigner Jim Killock told the BBC that officials 'would be able to build up a complex map of individuals' communications by examining records of "their mobile phone, their normal phone, their work email, their Facebook account and so on",' which 'could compromise journalistic sources, deter whistleblowers and increase the risk of personal details being hacked'.  The human rights organization Liberty also called for rejection of what is being called the "Snoopers' Charter".

Changes to oversight
The bill would change the authorisations given to police officers under RIPA. Instead of individual data requests being granted by a senior officer, the senior officer would grant powers once a month to investigating officers to conduct data requests on a topic they were investigating.

Additional changes to the role of Interception of Communications Commissioner and Information Commissioner are argued to improve oversight to the current arrangements under RIPA.

Justification

The basic justification is that communications traffic data is needed for investigations into serious crime, but access is declining. The Home Office cites that they expect access to decline from about 80% to around 60% of traffic data over the next decade if no action is taken. They also state, however, that the quantity of traffic data available is expected to grow by around 1000% in the same decade.

May stated that police made urgent requests for communications data in 30,000 cases last year and between 25% and 40% of them had resulted in lives being saved.  She said that "There is a limited scope for the data we want to have access to. We have been very clear about that at every stage. The police would have to make a clear case for requesting access to data when there was an investigation that required it.... The aim of this is to ensure our law enforcement agencies can carry on having access to the data they find so necessary operationally in terms of investigation, catching criminals and saving lives"

Though the bill had been mentioned in the context of terrorism and child sexual abuse, the powers could be used against minor crimes such as fly tipping.

Reactions
A survey by YouGov, commissioned by Big Brother Watch, found that 71% of Britons "did not trust that the data will be kept secure", and half described the proposal as "bad value for the money" as opposed to 12% calling it "good value".  At the RSA Conference Europe 2012, Jimmy Wales said the bill "will force many relatively small companies to hang on to data that they would not otherwise retain, which puts the data at risk".  Wales told MPs that Wikipedia would take action to hinder monitoring of users' interests by encrypting all communication to the UK by default if UK ISPs are mandated to track which pages on the site are visited.

Speaking at the launch of the World Wide Web Foundation's Web Index Tim Berners-Lee (inventor of the World Wide Web) talking about the bill stated "In Britain, like in the US, there has been a series of Bills that would give government very strong powers to, for example, collect data. I am worried about that." He added, "If the UK introduces draconian legislation that allows the Government to block websites or to snoop on people, which decreases privacy, in future indexes they may find themselves farther down the list".

Controversy
There are several main areas of controversy.

Patient and doctor private communication
As of November 2015, no ISP has announced or made public how they will handle and store information securely.

Physical limitations
From costs to how to power the machines, there are incredibly tough technical issues facing ISPs and some they might not be able to overcome. The sheer volume of data will push hardware software and network technologies beyond their design.

ISPs to retain logs for 12 months
The bill proposed that the obligation imposed on ISP providers to retain data about their clients online activities is vastly expanded. The current legislation allows ISP providers to retain information on clients for business purposes with a maximum time limit of 12 months. The proposed legislation will oblige communication service providers (CSPs) to retain a variety of information for 12 months and make this information available to state authorities upon request. The UK Internet Services Providers' Association (ISPA) have issued a statement raising concerns about the impact on the competitiveness of UK CSPs as it creates a less attractive and more onerous environment in which companies have to work. The ISPA also question whether there is a need to expand the scope of data retention requirements and requested a more detailed explanation of what, in practice, will be required of them.

Weakening encryption

Former UK Prime Minister David Cameron openly expressed a desire for encryption to be weakened or encrypted data to be easily accessible to legal forces in order to tackle terrorism and crime. This viewpoint has been widely addressed as uninformed and greatly dangerous to the privacy and information of the general public because of the dangers that this initiative would entail.

A ban on encryption would result in all information stored online to be openly visible to anyone, this information would include data such as bank details that might be input on online shopping websites, addresses, personal details as well as private messages sent on messaging services such as iMessage and WhatsApp that all use encryption in order to protect the identity and information of their users.

The encryption measures currently in place work on the basis that no third party would be able to access the data and banning this practice would mean that it would open not only to the government but also to anyone interested because encryption measures are not set to be sensitive to certain access requests, they are fully protective of all data stored under those measures.

Experts have made it clear that weakening or banning encryption would be extremely dangerous and damaging to the safety of the economic Internet environment and could have great repercussion on the information stored online and how it is used.

Oversight
The UK is unusual in the arrangement that Ministers sign off on warrants when the inspection of bulk collected data is requested by the security services. Just under 3 thousand warrants were requested and authorized in 2014 by the Secretary of State. Typically, in most democracies, independent judges decide and sign off police warrants in the cases where surveillance is of an intrusive nature.
Recently published Independent Review of Terrorism Legislation calls for UK to adopt the judicial authorisation as it is practised by other developed democracies.

There is a concern that No 10 will disregard the request for the reform of the oversight and the call for independent judges handling the sign off in the cases of highly intrusive surveillance.

Costs
Costs have been estimated at £1.8bn over the next ten years. However the basis of the calculations used to reach this figure have not been made public.

See also
 Anti-terrorism, Crime and Security Act 2001 § Part 11 (Retention of communications data)
 Internet censorship in the United Kingdom
 Mass surveillance in the United Kingdom
 Telecommunications data retention § United Kingdom

References

External links
 Bill text including: Foreword by the Home Secretary, Introduction, Draft Communications Data Bill and Explanatory Notes (interleaved), European Convention on Human Rights (ECHR) Memorandum and Delegated Powers Memorandum.
 Open Rights Group wiki article on this subject
 Save the Internet group
 Declaration of Internet Freedom
 Fight for the future

Surveillance
Government databases in the United Kingdom
Law enforcement techniques
Counterterrorism
Mass surveillance
National security policies
Proposed laws of the United Kingdom
Surveillance databases
2012 in British law
Home Office (United Kingdom)
GCHQ
2012 in British politics
Data laws of the United Kingdom
Articles containing video clips